Hassan Habibi (born February 7, 1939) is a retired Iranian association football player and manager.

Playing career
Habibi was born in Kerman, but at the age of four his family moved to Tehran, where his father found a job as a clerk for the Ministry of Health. He started his football career with Shahin F.C. and was selected to play for the national team in 1958. In 1960, he joined Taj S.C. where he played for a few seasons. In 1964, he joined PAS Tehran and played there until 1971, when he retired. He was the captain of the national teams that competed at the 1964 Summer Olympic Games, and won the silver medal at the 1966 Asian Games and the gold medal at the 1968 Asian Cup.

Coaching career
After retiring from competitions Habibi coached PAS Tehran. In 1979, he joined the Iran national football team, which then qualified for the 1980 Summer Olympics. However the Iran Football Federation boycotted the event due to occupation of Afghanistan by the Soviet Union. He then guided the national team to a bronze medal at the 1980 Asian Cup. He left from his position after the resignation of Nasser Noamooz, who was the Iranian Football Federation's General Secretary.

Then Habibi coached Ararat and help the club revive in the Tehran Provincial League and promote to Azadegan league. He returned to national team coaching 11 years later, this time managing the Iran national under-23 football team for qualification for the 1992 Summer Olympics. He introduced many talented players to Iran national teams such as Karim Bagheri, Mehrdad Minavand, Khodadad Azizi, Mehdi Mahdavikia, Yahya Golmohammadi, Reza Shahroudi, Afshin Peyrovani, Nima Nakisa and Javad Manafi.

Achievements 
Participation in 1964 Summer Olympic Games as a player
Qualification at 1980 Summer Olympic Games as Manager of Iran national football team
Third Place at 1980 Asian Cup as Manager of Iran national football team

References

External links

 

1939 births
Living people
Iranian footballers
People from Kerman
Footballers at the 1964 Summer Olympics
Iran national football team managers
Iranian football managers
1980 AFC Asian Cup managers
Esteghlal F.C. players
Pas players
Asian Games silver medalists for Iran
Olympic footballers of Iran
Asian Games medalists in football
Footballers at the 1966 Asian Games
Footballers at the 1970 Asian Games
Association football defenders
People from Kerman Province
Medalists at the 1966 Asian Games
1968 AFC Asian Cup players